The City Park Big Bass Fishing Rodeo is a fishing tournament founded in New Orleans, Louisiana in 1946. It is held annually in New Orleans' City Park and is the country’s oldest freshwater fishing tournament.

History
The Big Bass Fishing Rodeo was founded by Paul Kalman in 1946. He fished City Park's lagoons and conceived of the idea to hold an annual fishing tournament. The New Orleans Item newspaper sponsored the inaugural event and used a scale borrowed from Schwegmann Bros. Giant Supermarkets original store. The Paul Kalman award is given to the angler 12 years or under who lands the largest bass.

In the 1980s, Joe Courcelle introduced catch-and-release to the rodeo. He built a 400-gallon tank and asked fisherman to turn in their live catch, which were reintroduced to the lagoons. Due to Hurricane Katrina, City Park was unable to hold the Big Bass Rodeo in 2006 and 2007 while the lagoons were restocked. In 2008, the fishing rodeo returned to City Park's lagoons.

In recent years, the “Fishtival” was added to the rodeo. This is a festival surrounding the fishing rodeo which includes live music and wildlife, ecology and conservation educational exhibits.

References

External links
 City Park Big Bass Fishing Rodeo

Fishing tournaments
Fishing tournaments
1946 establishments in Louisiana
Recurring sporting events established in 1946